Kannanur Lokesh Rahul (born 18 April 1992) is an Indian international cricketer who plays as a right-handed wicket-keeper batsmen for Karnataka at the domestic level and is the captain for Lucknow Super Giants in the Indian Premier League.

He generally plays as an opener in Test and T20 formats of the game and plays in the middle order in the ODIs. Rahul is an occasional wicketkeeper in the shorter formats of the game at the international level, whereas he keeps the wicket more often at the domestic level.

He made his international debut in 2014 against Australia in the Boxing Day Test-match in Melbourne. Two years after his Test debut, Rahul made his One-Day International Debut in 2016 against Zimbabwe. Later on the same tour he made his T20I debut.

Rahul is the first Indian cricketer to score an ODI century on his debut. He is the fastest batsmen to score an International century across all the three formats, he took only 20 innings to achieve this feat.

Early and Personal life
KL Rahul was born on 18 April 1992 to KN Lokesh and Rajeshwari in Bangalore. His father Lokesh, is a professor and former director at the National Institute of Technology Karnataka (NITK) in Mangalore. His mother Rajeshwari is a professor at Mangalore University. Lokesh, who was a fan of the cricketer Sunil Gavaskar, wanted to name his son after Gavaskar's, but mistook Rohan Gavaskar's name as Rahul.

Rahul grew up in Mangalore, completing his high school at NITK English Medium School and pre-university at St. Aloysius College. He started cricket training at the age of 10, and, two years later, started playing matches for both Bangalore United Cricket Club and his club in Mangalore. At age 18 he moved to Bangalore to study at Jain University and pursue his cricket career.

On 23 January 2023, Rahul married his long time partner, Indian actress Athiya Shetty, daughter of actor Sunil Shetty, after dating for more than three years.

Domestic career
Rahul made his first-class cricket debut for Karnataka in the 2010–11 season. In the same season he represented his country at the 2010 ICC Under-19 Cricket World Cup, scoring a total of 143 runs in the competition. He made his debut in the Indian Premier League in 2013, for Royal Challengers Bangalore. During the 2013–14 domestic season he scored 1,033 first-class runs, the second highest scorer that season.

Playing for South Zone in the final of the 2014–15 Duleep Trophy against Central Zone, Rahul scored 185 off 233 balls in the first innings and 130 off 152 in the second. He was named the player of the match and selection to the Indian Test squad for the Australian tour followed.

Returning home after the Test series, Rahul became Karnataka's first triple-centurion, scoring 337 against Uttar Pradesh. He went on to score 188 in the 2014–15 Ranji Trophy final against Tamil Nadu and finished the season with an average of 93.11 in the nine matches he played.

International career

Test Debut (2014-16)
Rahul made his Test debut in the 2014 Boxing Day Test at the Melbourne Cricket Ground. He replaced Rohit Sharma and was presented with his Test cap by MS Dhoni. He managed to score only 3 and 1 on his debut. In the next test at Sydney where he opened the innings for the first time, made his maiden international century, scoring 110 runs.  

He was named in the 15-man squad for the Indian tour of Bangladesh in June 2015 but withdrew due to Dengue fever. He returned to the side for the first Test of the Sri Lankan tour after Murali Vijay was ruled out due to injury, scoring his second Test century and winning the Man of the Match award. During the match, he kept wicket after Wriddhiman Saha was injured. 

In July 2016, Rahul was named in the squad for India tour of West Indies. In the second test of the series Rahul scored 158 runs, his then highest score in test cricket. In September 2016, he was named in the squad for the home series against New Zealand. After the first test he was replaced by Gautam Gambhir due to an injury.

Rahul was selected in the squad against England in the 2016-17 Test series, but was injured while training in the nets. He was ruled out of the third test, he made his comeback to the team in the fourth test but failed to make an impact. In the fifth and final test of the series Rahul went on to make his fourth test ton, scoring his career-best 199 runs.

ODI and T20I debut (2016)
Rahul was named in the squad to tour Zimbabwe in 2016 and made his One Day International (ODI) debut against Zimbabwe at Harare Sports Club. Rahul scored an unbeaten 100*(115) on debut, thus becoming the first Indian cricketer to score a century on ODI debut. He was adjudged the man of the series. He made his Twenty20 International (T20I) debut later in the same tour. Rahul got out on a golden duck on his T20I debut as India lost the first T20I against Zimbabwe. Rahul was named in T20I squad for the tour of West Indies in 2016,where he made his first T20I century, scoring an unbeaten 110 off just 51 balls and became the first player to score a T20I century while batting at number four. However, India lost the match by just 1 run.

Rise through the ranks
In his 20th international innings, Rahul became the fastest batsman to have scored centuries in all three formats, surpassing the record of Ahmed Shehzad who took 76 innings.  On 3 July 2018, Rahul smashed his second T20 International ton against   England. He is also the first Indian batsman to be dismissed hit-wicket in T20Is.

Controversy and suspension
On 11 January 2019, Hardik Pandya and K. L. Rahul were suspended by the Board of Control for Cricket in India (BCCI) following controversial comments they made on the Indian talk show Koffee with Karan earlier in the month. They were both sent home ahead of the ODI series against Australia and the fixtures of India's tour to New Zealand. On 24 January 2019, after lifting the suspension on Pandya and Rahul, the BCCI announced that Rahul would re-join the squad for India A matches.

2019 Cricket World Cup 
In April 2019, he was named in India's squad for the 2019 Cricket World Cup. He played at number 4 in the first 2 games but got back to opening the innings alongside Rohit Sharma as Shikhar Dhawan was ruled out of the rest of the tournament due to injury. Overall, Rahul scored 361 runs with 2 fifties and 1 hundred in the tournament and finished as India's third highest run scorer in the tournament after Rohit Sharma and Virat Kohli.

Consistency in limited over formats and dip in form in tests
Due to lack of form in the Test format, Rahul was dropped from the Test squad for the Home tests against South Africa. However, he remained in the limited over sides.

In December 2019, in the first T20I match against the West Indies, Rahul scored his 1,000th run in T20I cricket. He scored 62 (40) in the first T20I against West Indies. He scored 91 (56) in the third T20I for which he was adjudged the Man of the match. He scored his 3rd ODI century in the 2nd ODI against West Indies. In the 2 match T20I series against Sri Lanka, Rahul scored 45 in the first match and 54 in the second T20I.

In January 2020, Rahul made 80 (52) batting at number five in the second ODI against Australia and was rewarded as the man of the match.

In India's tour of New Zealand in 2019–20, Rahul was declared man of the series in the five-match T20I series for scoring 224 runs at an average of 56. He was also the stand in captain in the 5th T20I after Rohit Sharma suffered a hamstring injury during the 1st innings. In the ODI series against New Zealand, he scored 88* (64) in the first ODI and scored his fourth ton in ODIs, 112 (113) in the third ODI.

Australia Tour and home matches against England
In October 2020, Rahul was named as India's vice captain for the ODI and T20I series against Australia. Rahul had a moderate ODI and T20I series against Australia. He made 77 against Australia in the second ODI and 51 in the first T20I. India lost the ODI series 2–1, but won the T20I series by the same margin.

Rahul was included in the test squad for the Border-Gavaskar Trophy but was not picked in the playing XI for the first two Tests. He injured himself during practice and was ruled out of the remaining part of the tour.

As a result, he also missed the home Test series against England in February 2021. He returned to the national side for the T20I and ODI series against England. There was a dip in his form in the T20I series. He returned to form in the ODI series scoring a match-winning 62* and was involved in a 100-run partnership with debutant Krunal Pandya who scored a fifty. He continued his form by scoring 108 runs in the second ODI and was involved in another 100-run partnership with Rishabh Pant.

Comeback in Test Format
Rahul was named in India's test squad for their tour of England in 2021. As Shubman Gill and Mayank Agarwal were injured, Rahul opened alongside teammate Rohit Sharma.In the first test at Trent Bridge, Rahul scored 84 and 26. He went on to score 129 (250) at Lords and was awarded the man of the match in the second test. Rahul scored 315 runs in eight innings of four matches played and was the second highest run scorer for India in the tour behind Rohit Sharma.

Inconsistency and vice captaincy (2021)

T20I World cup 2021
In September 2021, Rahul was named in India's squad for the 2021 ICC Men's T20 World Cup. He was the highest run scorer for India in the tournament, scoring 194 runs including three consecutive fifties. He also scored the tournament's joint fastest fifty in just 18 balls, against Scotland.
After Virat Kohli stepped down as Indian T20i captain, Rahul was appointed the Vice-captain of Indian Cricket Team in T20i as former Vice-captain Rohit Sharma was appointed the new Captain of T20i format. Later, Rahul was appointed ODI vice-captain as well due to change of captaincy in white ball format of Indian team.

In December 2021, Rahul was named as India's test vice-captain for the away series against South Africa after India's regular vice-captain Rohit Sharma was ruled out of the series. Rahul was also named as the ODI captain for the One Day series of the same tour as India's regular ODI captain Rohit Sharma was ruled out of the series due to a hamstring injury. In the first test match against South Africa in December 2021, he scored 123 in India's first innings and 23 in India's second innings. For this performance, he was awarded the Man of the Match award.

2022 – present
In the second test against South Africa in January 2022, Rahul captained India for the first time in test cricket and became the 34th Test captain of India. He scored a half-century on captaincy debut. Despite his best efforts, Rahul couldn't lead the team to victory and India lost the second Test by seven wickets. In first ODI against South Africa, he made his debut in ODI Captaincy and became the 26th ODI captain of India, however India lost the series 3–0 to South Africa South Africa.

In February 2022, During the second ODI of India against the West Indies, Rahul scored 49 (48) and completed 6000 runs in International cricket across all formats. In the same ODI, Rahul sustained an upper left hamstring strain, and was ruled out of the next ODI as well as the upcoming T20Is series against the West Indies. Rahul was named captain for the South African tour of India in June, but was later ruled out of the series due to a groin injury. After a successful sports hernia surgery, Rahul came back to the team and was named captain for the India Tour of Zimbabwe in August.

Rahul was the stand-in captain for the team during the last match played by team India in the 2022 Asia Cup against Afghanistan. 

Since his last 100 against South Africa in 2021, Rahul failed to score big runs due to this in February 2023 BCCI sacked him from Test vice-captaincy, many former cricketers and fans questioned his spot in the team and heavily criticized.

Indian Premier League

Beginning of IPL career
Rahul made his Indian Premier League (IPL) debut for Royal Challengers Bangalore (RCB) as a wicket-keeper batsman during the 2013 competition. Ahead of the 2014 IPL, he was bought by the Sunrisers Hyderabad for INR 1 crore, before returning to RCB ahead of the 2016 IPL season.

In the 2016 IPL season with Royal Challengers Bangalore, Rahul finished the season as the 11th highest run-scorer, and RCB's third, with 397 runs from 14 matches. For his performances in the 2016 IPL season, he was named as wicket keeper in the Cricinfo and Cricbuzz IPL XI. 
Rahul missed the 2017 season due to a shoulder injury.

2018 season
In the 2018 IPL Auction, he was bought by Kings XI Punjab (now Punjab Kings) for INR 11 crore, the joint-third highest price. In the team's first match of the season he scored the fastest 50 in IPL history, taking 14 balls to reach the milestone and breaking the record of Sunil Narine.

KL in total scored 659 runs in the season at a strike rate of 158.41 and an average of 54.91. He finished the season as third highest run scorer in the 2018 IPL Season. For his performances in the 2018 IPL season, he was named in the Cricinfo and Cricbuzz IPL XI.

2019 season
After making scores of 90+ three times during 2018, he reached his maiden IPL century in 2019, scoring 100 not out from 64 against Mumbai Indians (MI).In total KL scored 593 runs in the season with average of 53.90 and strike rate of 135.38. He finished the season as second highest run scorer in the season after David Warner(692 runs). For his performances in the 2019 IPL season, he was named in the Cricinfo IPL XI.

Captaining Kings XI Punjab and 2020 season
On 19 December 2019, Rahul was announced as captain of the Punjab for the 2020 season, after former captain Ravichandran Ashwin was traded to Delhi Capitals.

In the match against RCB on 24 September 2020, he scored an unbeaten 132* off just 69 balls. He was declared the man of the match for this record breaking innings. With that century, he broke the record of the most runs scored by an Indian batsman in an IPL match. He also broke the record of the most runs scored by a captain in an IPL match.

However, team performance was very poor as they lost 6 out of their first 7 games with some nail-biting games. But suddenly team made terrific  comeback as they won next 5 consecutive games against top teams on Points table. Even though they failed to qualify for playoffs finishing at sixth position once again.

In the IPL 2020 season, he scored 670 runs in all the 14 matches he played. He scored 5 fifties and 1 hundred with the highest score of an unbeaten 132 against RCB and also had an average of 55.83.

Rahul won the Orange Cap in IPL 2020 for scoring most runs in IPL 2020 (670 runs). He was also awarded as the Dream 11 Game changer of the season.

IPL 2021 season
KL Rahul was retained as the captain by the Punjab Kings ahead of the 2021 IPL season. KL scored 91(50) in their first fixture against Rajasthan Royals (RR). KL scored match winning 60*(52) against MI and 91*(57) against RCB and won Man of the Match in both the games.

In the final league game of Punjab Kings, KL scored unbeaten 98*(42) against Chennai Super Kings (CSK), helping the team get the target in 13 overs to give them a slight chance to qualify, however, the team ended up at sixth position. He scored 626 runs in IPL 2021, finishing as the team's highest scorer in the season.

Lucknow Super Giants 2022 season
Prior to the 2022, Rahul parted ways with the Punjab Kings and was drafted by Lucknow Super Giants (LSG) as their captain for INR 17Cr making him the joint highest paid cricketer in the IPL alongside Virat Kohli. On 16 April 2022, Rahul scored his first century for Lucknow (103* off 60) against the Mumbai and became the first and only player to score a century in one's 100th IPL match. He followed this up with another unbeaten century(103* off 62) against the same opposition eight days later.

Playing style 

KL Rahul is an opening right-handed batter who occasionally keep wickets in the shorter format of the game. Rahul also plays in the middle order in the ODI format, he is also termed as the go-to wicketkeeper in the format on several occasions. Cricket pundits and media often criticize him for his inconsistency in run scoring.. In the longer format he is known for his techniques and application that has earned him success in both home and away conditions. In T20s Rahul is known for his attacking approach in the IPL which is contrasting to his careful approach at the international level that has lead to his criticism on many occasions. 

In many interviews KL has mentioned that, he believes that strike rates are overrated and a player should bat according to what the situation of the match demands.

Career summary
As of March 2023 Rahul has made 14 international centuries - 7 in Test cricket, 5 in One-Day Internationals and 2 in T20Is.  Rahul is the only Indian player to score a century on his ODI debut. He is also the first batter to score a century in T20Is while playing at 4th or lower batting position.

List of international centuries by KL Rahul

See also 

 Sport in India – Overview of sports in India 
 Sports in Karnataka
 List of cricketers with centuries in all international formats
 List of centuries scored on One Day International cricket debut
 List of international cricket centuries at Lord's

Footnotes

References

External links

 
Lokesh Rahul at Wisden India

1992 births
Living people
India Test cricketers
India One Day International cricketers
India Twenty20 International cricketers
Karnataka cricketers
Cricketers from Mangalore
Sunrisers Hyderabad cricketers
Royal Challengers Bangalore cricketers
South Zone cricketers
Cricketers who made a century on One Day International debut
Punjab Kings cricketers
Cricketers at the 2019 Cricket World Cup
Wicket-keepers